Navlab is a series of autonomous and semi-autonomous vehicles developed by teams from The Robotics Institute at the School of Computer Science, Carnegie Mellon University. Later models were produced under a new department created specifically for the research called "The Carnegie Mellon University Navigation Laboratory". Navlab 5 notably steered itself almost all the way from Pittsburgh to San Diego.

History
Research on computer controlled vehicles began at Carnegie Mellon in 1984 as part of the DARPA Strategic Computing Initiative and production of the first vehicle, Navlab 1, began in 1986.

Applications
The vehicles in the Navlab series have been designed for varying purposes, "... off-road scouting; automated highways; run-off-road collision prevention; and driver assistance for maneuvering in crowded city environments. Our current work involves pedestrian detection, surround sensing, and short range sensing for vehicle control."

Several types of vehicles have been developed, including "... robot cars, vans, SUVs, and buses."

Vehicles
The institute has made vehicles with the designations Navlab 1 through 10. The vehicles were mainly semi-autonomous, though some were fully autonomous and required no human input.

Navlab 1 was  built in 1986 using a Chevrolet panel van. The van had 5 racks of computer hardware, including 3 Sun workstations, video hardware and GPS receiver, and a Warp supercomputer.

Navlab 2 was built in 1990 using a US Army HMMWV. Computer power was uprated for this new vehicle with three Sparc 10 computers, "for high level data processing", and two 68000-based computers "used for low level control". The Hummer was capable of driving both off- or on-road. When Navlab 2 was driven on-road it could achieve as high as 

Navlab 1 and 2 were semi-autonomous and used "... steering wheel and drive shaft encoders and an expensive inertial navigation system for position estimation."

Navlab 5 used a 1990 Pontiac Trans Sport minivan. In July 1995, the team took it from Pittsburgh to San Diego on a proof-of-concept trip, dubbed "No Hands Across America", with the system navigating for all but 50 of the 2850 miles, averaging over 60 MPH. In 2007, Navlab 5 was added to the Class of 2008 inductees of the Robot Hall of Fame.

Navlabs 6 and 7 were both built with Pontiac Bonnevilles. Navlab 8 was built with an Oldsmobile Silhouette van. Navlabs 9 and 10 were both built out of Houston transit buses.

See also
Driverless car

References

External links
 The Robotics Institute website
 Navlab website
 PANS paper (1995) for the Navlab 5

Experimental self-driving cars
Carnegie Mellon University
Robots of the United States
1986 robots
1990 robots
2007 robots